Scott may refer to:

Places

Canada 
 Scott, Quebec, municipality in the Nouvelle-Beauce regional municipality in Quebec
 Scott, Saskatchewan, a town in the Rural Municipality of Tramping Lake No. 380
 Rural Municipality of Scott No. 98, Saskatchewan

United States 
 Scott, Arkansas
 Scott, Georgia
 Scott, Indiana
 Scott, Louisiana
 Scott, Missouri
 Scott, New York
 Scott, Ohio
 Scott, Wisconsin (disambiguation) (several places)
 Fort Scott, Kansas
 Great Scott Township, St. Louis County, Minnesota
 Scott Air Force Base, Illinois
 Scott City, Kansas
 Scott City, Missouri
 Scott County (disambiguation) (various states)
 Scott Mountain, a mountain in Oregon
 Scott River, in California
 Scott Township (disambiguation) (several places)

Elsewhere
 876 Scott, minor planet orbiting the Sun
 Scott (crater), a lunar impact crater near the south pole of the Moon
Scott Conservation Park, a protected area in South Australia

People 
 Scott (surname), including a list of people and fictional characters with the surname
 Scott (given name), including a list of people and fictional characters with the given name
 Clan Scott, Scottish clan, historically based in the Scottish Borders

Companies 
 H. H. Scott, Inc., vintage tube hi-fi manufacturer
 Scott Paper Company, formerly an American manufacturer of paper-based personal care products
 Scott Sports, Swiss manufacturer of bicycles, winter equipment, motorsports gear and sportswear
 The Scott Motorcycle Company, English manufacturer of motorcycles and light engines for industry
 W. R. Scott, a defunct American publisher

Music
 Scott (album), debut solo album by Scott Walker, followed by Scott 2, Scott 3, and Scott 4
 "Scott", song by Deathray, on the album Deathray

Ships 
 HMS Scott, three ships of the Royal Navy
 USS Scott, several ships of the US Navy

Other 
 Scott-T transformer or Scott connection, a type of circuit used to produce two-phase electric power
 Scott, one of two probes on NASA's Deep Space 2 mission; named after polar explorer Robert Falcon Scott.
 NBR Scott Class, a class of steam locomotive on the North British Railway
 Scott catalogue, stamp catalogue by the Scott Publishing Co.
 Scott House (disambiguation)
 Scott–Marcondes Cesar–São José dos Campos, Brazilian cycling team

See also 

Justice Scott (disambiguation)
Scot (disambiguation)
Scott Free (disambiguation)